The British Library contains a wide range of fine and historic bookbindings; however, books in the Library are organised primarily by subject rather than by binding so the Library has produced a guide to enable researchers to identity bindings of interest.  The collection includes the oldest intact Western bookbinding, the leather binding of the 7th century St Cuthbert Gospel.   

Some gifts by, or purchases from, collectors of bindings are registered and kept together.  A small number of bindings are always displayed in the Ritblat Gallery at the St Pancras site in London, and others can be examined in the reading rooms.  There is also a display of the stamps and tools used for the books of George III near the entrance to the Conservation Centre.

See also
John Jaffray (bookbinder)
Howard Nixon, scholar of bookbinding and deputy keeper, British Museum

References

Further reading
Marks, P. J. M. (2011) Beautiful Bookbindings: a thousand years of the bookbinder's art. London: British Library. 
Marks, P. J. M. (1998) The British Library Guide to Bookbinding: history and techniques. London: British Library. 
Marks, P.J.M, and David Grinyer. “The Trials of Going Online: The Image Database of British Library Bookbindings.” New Library World, no. 9 (2002): 328–35.
 Francis, Sir Frank, ed. (1971) Treasures of the British Museum. London: Thames & Hudson; pp. 318-22

External links
British Library Binding Index

Bookbinding
British Library collections